Caleb Chakravarthi (born January 2, 1999) is an American tennis player.

Chakravarthi made his ATP main draw debut at the 2022 Dallas Open after entering into the singles main draw as a wildcard.

Chakravathi played college tennis at Illinois before transferring to SMU.

References

External links

1999 births
Living people
American male tennis players
Sportspeople from Irvine, California
SMU Mustangs men's tennis players
Illinois Fighting Illini men's tennis players
Tennis people from California